Rhinophylla is a genus of South American bats in the family Phyllostomidae containing these species:
Hairy little fruit bat, R. alethina
Fischer's little fruit bat, R. fischerae
Dwarf little fruit bat, R. pumilio

References

Phyllostomidae
Bat genera
Taxa named by Wilhelm Peters
Taxonomy articles created by Polbot